The 1966–67 season was Port Vale's 55th season of football in the English Football League, and their second successive season (third overall) in the Fourth Division. Again hopeful of escape from the basement division, Vale could only manage a mid-table finish. Player-manager Jackie Mudie resigned at the end of the season. Veteran defender Roy Sproson became the club's first ever Player of the Year winner.

Overview

Fourth Division
The pre-season saw general manager Stanley Matthews injured in a car accident with a National Coal Board lorry on 29 July, Jackie Mudie was also in the car but remained relatively unharmed. As Matthews recovered in came four new forwards, the most significant of which was Crystal Palace's Ian Lawson. Lawson cost £1,000 with an additional £1,000 signing on fee. Other new faces included winger Mick Mahon (Loughborough United); inside-forward Jimmy Goodfellow (Bishop Auckland); and Billy McCartney (Rangers). There was a kit change to an all-white strip, upon the suggestion of Stanley Matthews.

The season opened with a 2–1 home win over Southport using an optimistic 4–2–4 formation. Following Roy Sproson's winning goal there was a pitch invasion – by then a disturbingly common occurrence. Six games without a loss followed, leaving the club in fourth position. Goals were still rare however, and so Lawson was dropped from the first eleven, despite the departure of in-form forward John Rowland to Mansfield Town for £6,500. Financial difficulties made the atmosphere around Burslem quite gloomy, not helped by the news that former Valiant John Nicholson had been killed in a car crash. Vale's form suffered, though the defence remained quite strong. Young Scot Mick Cullerton was a ray of sunshine for the club in front of goal.

Good form in the Christmas period continued into an unbeaten January in the league, as the club climbed to within five points of the promotion places. In came forward Mel Charles from Porthmadog for a £1,250 fee. A 1–0 defeat at Gresty Road to Crewe Alexandra in front of an unruly crowd marked the first of a crucial seven game sequence against the promotion hopefuls. A win over Barrow and a draw at Stockport County were succeeded by five straight defeats, killing Vale's promotion hopes dead. They reversed the decline by doing the double over Rochdale within two days, including a 5–0 victory witnessed by 3,004 fans at Vale Park. In April, popular player John Ritchie was sold to Preston North End for £17,500. Mel Charles sidelined with a knee injury, Vale limped to the season's end without a win in their final five games. On 3 May, Stuart Chapman made his debut at the age of fifteen in a 2–2 draw with Lincoln City. Five days later, manager Jackie Mudie tendered his resignation as player-manager, citing 'personal reasons'.

They finished in thirteenth place with 43 points, marking a slight improvement on the previous campaign. Mick Cullerton's twelve goals in all competitions were enough to make him the top-scorer. In the club's first ever Player of the Year ceremony, veteran defender Roy Sproson was bestowed with the honour. Meanwhile, the club's youth team performed brilliantly, reaching the quarter-finals of the FA Youth Cup, where they were eliminated 3–0 by Scunthorpe United.

Finances
On the financial side, there was a loss of £7,925 despite a transfer credit of £20,425 and a donation of £19,381 from the Sportsmen's Association and the Development Pool. Gate receipts were just £30,298, whilst the club's overdraft stood at £82,373. Nine players were released at the end of the season, most notably: Mel Charles (Oswestry Town); Ian Lawson and Brian Taylor (Barnsley); and untested reserve Ray Kennedy – who would take a break from football before returning to the game to play for Liverpool and England. Roddy Georgeson was also released at his own request to work in a bank, though he soon turned out for Dundee before beginning a long career in Scottish football.

Cup competitions
In the FA Cup, a 4–3–3 formation was used to defeat Bradford City 2–1 at Valley Parade with a forty-yard 'goal of a lifetime' from John Ritchie. Vale drew Barnsley in the Second Round, and earned a replay with a 1-1 draw at Oakwell. The replay attracted 12,784 supporters, but "Tykes" ran out 3–1 winners.

In the League Cup, Third Division Walsall knocked out the Vale at the first stage with a 3–1 win.

League table

Results
Port Vale's score comes first

Football League Fourth Division

Results by matchday

Matches

FA Cup

League Cup

Player statistics

Appearances

Top scorers

Transfers

Transfers in

Transfers out

Loans out

References
Specific

General

Port Vale F.C. seasons
Port Vale